The Škoda 03 T (sold as Škoda Astra, later Škoda Anitra (Asynchronní nízkopodlažní tramvaj; Asynchronous Low-floor Tram)) is a three-section low-floor tram developed by Škoda Transportation and Inekon Group. The design was introduced in 1996, and the first car was completed in 1998. The joint venture between Škoda and Inekon was dissolved in 2001, after which Škoda continued to sell the 03 T, while Inekon formed a new partnership with DPO (Dopravní podnik Ostrava, the city transport company of Ostrava), known as DPO Inekon, and in 2002 began selling a nearly identical version of the Astra, under the name Trio.

The 03 T is uni-directional and has a low floor over half of its length. The front and rear sections, under which the wheels are placed, have a high floor; the middle section, between these, has a low floor.

Some other Škoda trams, such as the 05 T and 10 T, are based on the Astra.

Deliveries and operation

References

External links 

 Škoda Astra at Skoda.cz 

Tram vehicles of the Czech Republic
Škoda trams